The Derby de la Bretagne (Brittany Derby; also known as the Derby Breton is a football match. The match can potentially designate any match-up between two sporting football associations based in the historic province of Brittany; however, most of the time, it is employed by each club's supporters to mention a football match contested between major French clubs Stade Rennais and FC Nantes, even if this particular match is often referred to as the West Derby.

History
The name of the derby derives from the fact that Rennes and Nantes are the two major clubs that are situated in the former province of Brittany. The derby may also refer to matches involving fellow Brittany clubs FC Lorient, En Avant Guingamp, and Stade Brestois; however, the derby has been historically contested by Rennes and Nantes.

Nantes and the current incarnation of Rennes, having previously been known as Stade Rennais Université Club, first met on 15 December 1963 in a league match, which the former team won 2–1.
Due to each club's affiliation to the Breton heritage, the derby is regularly contested to decide "which city is the real capital of Brittany". Both clubs display their Breton identity proudly. Rennes supporters regularly display Celtic symbols at Tribune Mordelles, where the notorious supporters' group Roazhon Celtic Kop are located, while Nantes often display the Bretagne flag in their primary colors, yellow and green.

FC Lorient's status in the derby came about from their promotion to Ligue 1 at the start of the  new millennium. Though the club were relegated after one season, it regained promotion for the 2006–07 season and have consistently stayed up, often finishing ahead of Nantes, who have been relegated twice since Lorient's arrival for the 2006–07 season. Since Nantes' fall to the second division and its inability to regain promotion, the derby is regularly contested by Rennes and Lorient. The derby took a notable rise following the 2–1 victory by Guingamp over Rennes in the 2009 Coupe de France Final. This was the first final since 1956 where both clubs were based in the same region and both clubs displayed their Breton culture proudly.

Statistics

See also

2009 Coupe de France Final
2014 Coupe de France Final

References

External links
Official club websites
 FC Nantes
Stade Rennais FC
 FC Lorient
 EA Guingamp

French football derbies
Stade Rennais F.C.
FC Lorient
FC Nantes
En Avant Guingamp
Football in Brittany
Stade Brestois 29